Haiyin Bridge  is a bridge crossing the Pearl River in Guangzhou, China.

The double tower single plane cable stayed bridge was completed in 1988 and 
connects Haizhu District with Yuexiu District.

References

Bridges in Guangzhou
Bridges over the Pearl River (China)
Bridges completed in 1988